Deh Namak or Deh-e Namak may refer to:
 Deh-e Namak, Markazi
 Deh Namak, Semnan